South Milwaukee High School, "Home of the Rockets," is a high school located in the city of South Milwaukee, Wisconsin, United States, a suburb of Milwaukee. Approximately 1,000 students attend the high school. The school is operated by the School District of South Milwaukee.

Extracurricular activities
A variety of sports and activities are offered at South Milwaukee High School. The athletic teams compete in the Woodland Conference of the WIAA. SMHS won state championships in boys' cross country in 1937, 1938, 1939, 1940, 1941, 1949, 1950, 1951, 1952 and 1965.

Notable graduates
 Jerry Dreva
 Lauren Kleppin
 Reginald Lisowski
 Kurt Nimphius
 Phil Sobocinski

References

External links
South Milwaukee High School
 School District of South Milwaukee
South Milwaukee Performing Arts Center at SMHS

Public high schools in Wisconsin
Schools in Milwaukee County, Wisconsin